Tren de Gran Canaria  (TGC, the Train of Gran Canaria) is a proposed railway on the island of Gran Canaria in the Canary Islands. It is planned to run from the island's capital, Las Palmas along the eastern coast of the island, serving Gran Canaria Airport and terminating in Maspalomas. First announced in 2004, construction on the line has not yet commenced due to funding difficulties.

History
Between 1893 and 1944 steam tram ran between Las Palmas and Puerto de La Luz. The line was electrified in 1910, although the line reverted to steam traction in 1944, when trams were hauled by a steam locomotive known as La Pepa.

A plan to build a north-south rail link began with the building of an experimental tren vertebrado ("vertebrate train") track in Las Palmas between 1972 and 1974. The transit system, designed by Basque engineer Alejandro Goicoechea, consisted of an unusual low-profile train running on elevated concrete tracks through Las Palmas. The project was unsuccessful and was dismantled within a year.

Plans to develop a rapid transit railway line on Gran Canaria linking the capital with San Bartolomé de Tirajana in the south were put forward in the early 21st century by the Gran Canaria Cabildo. The line would run along the eastern coast and connect Las Palmas with the airport. In 2004 the Spanish Ministry of Development put a contract out to competitive tender for a feasibility study on a 50 km railway line from Las Palmas to Maspalomas.

Originally, it was planned to construct the railway in phases, with an initial phase consisting of a line running between San Telmo Park in Las Palmas and El Veril Beach on the edge of Playa del Inglés.
In future phases the line could be extended northwards into central Las Palmas, with a terminus at Santa Catalina park, and at the southern end the line would be extended through Maspalomas to terminate at Meloneras. In 2008 the Cabildo announced its intention to construct the full route from Las Palmas to Meloneras in a single phase.

In 2009 the plans were approved by the Autonomous Government of the Canary Islands, and a planned operational date was given as 2015. The Cabildo's Autoridad Única del Transporte de Gran Canaria formed a public company called Ferrocarriles de Gran Canaria to manage the construction project. The total cost of the scheme was estimated at €1,500 million.

The Cabildo applied to Spain's central Government for funding for the project, but the scheme did not progress due to budgetary constraints. Between 2009 and 2018, the Spanish Ministry of Development and the Cabildo had spent €22.42 million on preparatory work for the new railway line.  In January 2018 the Ministry of Development and the Cabildo announced that almost all the contracts had been awarded to enable construction to go ahead, including alterations to the route. Funding of €25.28 million has been awarded to the project by the Spanish state. However, there are still some funding difficulties that prevent the beginning of the construction on the line and the railway.

 the cost of the scheme has been estimated as €1,650 million. The Cabildo de Gran Canaria has applied to the European Regional Development Fund (ERDF) for 85% funding for the project, while the remaining 15% will be raised through funding from local and regional government and from private finance.

As of 2022, it's still unknown if the construction of the line will ever begin.

Route
The planned  railway line would run between Las Palmas in the north and Meloneras in the south of the island.  The line is planned to have 11 stations, including an underground station at Gran Canaria Airport. Much of the line is planned to run in tunnels, with the section in the capital running entirely underground as far as the suburb of Jinámar.

According to plans published by the Cabildo, stations are planned in Santa Catalina Park, San Telmo Park, the island Hospital, Jinámar, Telde, Gran Canaria Airport, Carrizal, Arinaga, Vecindario, Playa del Inglés and Meloneras. An additional station at Juan Grande has been proposed by the mayor of San Bartolome de Tirajana. Journey times between Las Palmas and Meloneras would be 25–30 minutes.

Rolling stock

The trains that will to operate on the Gran Canaria railway are planned to be a hybrid of a commuter train and a high speed train. Eventually, 13 units will operate on the line.

In 2009, a full-scale mockup of the proposed Gran Canaria train was put on public display in San Telmo park, Las Palmas.

See also
Tenerife Tram
Tren del Sur
Mallorca rail network
Rail transport in Spain

References

External links
Autoridad Única del Transporte de Gran Canaria (Gran Canaria Transport Authority)
Ferrocarriles de Gran Canaria videos - 3D fly-through visualisations of the planned stations

Proposed railway lines in Spain
Las Palmas
Transport in Gran Canaria